The First Anglo-Burmese War (5 March 1824 – 24 February 1826), also known as the First Burma War, was the first of three wars fought between the British and Burmese empires in the 19th century. The war, which began primarily over the control of what is now Northeastern India, ended in a decisive British victory, giving the British total control of Assam, Manipur, Cachar and Jaintia as well as Arakan Province and Tenasserim. The Burmese submitted to a British demand to pay an indemnity of one million pounds sterling, and signed a commercial treaty.

This war was the longest and most expensive war in British Indian history. Fifteen thousand European and Indian soldiers died, together with an unknown number of Burmese military and civilian casualties. The high cost of the campaign to the British, 5–13 million pounds sterling (£ – £ as of ) contributed to a severe economic crisis in British India which cost the East India Company its remaining privileges.

Although once strong enough to threaten the interests of the British East India Company (especially with respect to the eastern border regions of Assam, Manipur, and Arakan), the Burmese Empire now suffered "the beginning of the end" of its status as an independent nation. They would be economically burdened for years to come by the cost of the indemnity. The British, eventually waging the Second and Third Anglo-Burmese Wars against a much-weakened Burma, would assume control of the entire country by 1885.

Causes

By 1822, Burmese expansion into Manipur and Assam had created a long border between British India and the Burmese Empire. The British, based in Calcutta, supported rebels from Manipur, Assam and Arakan fleeing into British territory. Calcutta unilaterally declared Cachar and Jaintia British protectorates and sent in troops. 

Cross border raids into these newly acquired territories from British territories and spheres of influence vexed the Burmese. Convinced that war was inevitable, Burmese commander-in-chief Maha Bandula became the main proponent of offensive policy against the British. Bandula was part of the war party at Bagyidaw's court, which also included Queen Me Nu and her brother, the Lord of Salin. Bandula believed that a decisive victory could allow Ava to consolidate its gains in its new western empire in Arakan, Manipur, Assam, Cachar, and Jaintia, as well as take over eastern Bengal.

In September 1823, the casus belli was Burma occupying Shalpuri Island near Chittagong, which was claimed by the East India Company.

In January 1824, Burma sent one of their top generals, Thado Thiri Maha Uzana, into Cachar and Jaintia to disperse the rebels. The British sent in their own force to meet the Burmese in Cachar, resulting in the first clashes between the two. The war formally broke out on 5 March 1824, following border clashes in Arakan.

The British reason for the war was, in addition to expanding British Bengal's sphere of influence, the desire for new markets for British manufacturing. The British were also anxious to deny the French the use of Burmese harbours and concerned about French influence at the Court of Ava, as the kingdom was still known to them. British Ambassador Michael Symes's mission was equipped to gain as much knowledge as possible of the country for future British plans whereas previous envoys were concerned principally with trade concessions. 

Anglo-French rivalry had already played a role during Alaungpaya's endeavours of unifying the kingdom. The Burmese in these wars were advancing into smaller states not ruled by the British or the subject of expansionist goals by the British before the war began, and the British were not so much preoccupied by the refugee problem initially as by the threat posed by the French until further incidents forced their hand.

War

Western theatre
The commander in chief of the Burmese army, Maha Bandula, was supported by twelve of the country's best divisions, including one under his personal command, all totaling 10,000 men and 500 horses. His general staff included some of the country's most decorated soldiers, men such as the Lord of Salay and the governors of Danyawaddy, Wuntho, and Taungoo. Bandula's plan was to attack the British on two fronts: Chittagong from Arakan in the southeast, and Sylhet from Cachar and Jaintia in the north. Bandula personally commanded the Arakan theatre while Uzana commanded the Cachar and Jaintia theater.

Early in the war, battle-hardened Burmese forces were able to push back the British forces because the Burmese, who had been fighting in the jungles of Manipur and Assam for nearly a decade, were more familiar with the terrain, which represented "a formidable obstacle to the march of a European force". Uzana had already defeated the British units in Cachar and Jaintia in January 1824. 

Sa's column then joined Bandula's column on the march to defeat British forces at Gadawpalin, and went on to capture Cox's Bazar. The Burmese success caused extreme panic in Chittagong and in Calcutta. Across the eastern Bengal, the European inhabitants formed themselves into militia forces. A large portion of the crews of the East India Company's ships was landed to assist in the defense of Calcutta.

But Bandula, not wanting to overstretch, stopped U Sa from proceeding to Chittagong. Had Bandula marched on to Chittagong, which unbeknown to him was lightly held, he could have taken it and the way to Calcutta would have been open. Had they been able to threaten Calcutta, the Burmese could have obtained more favourable terms in the peace negotiations later on.

Inside Burma

Battle of Yangon (May–December 1824)

Instead of fighting in hard terrain, the British took the fight to the Burmese mainland. On 11 May 1824, a British naval force of over 10,000 men (5,000 British soldiers and over 5,000 Indian sepoys) entered the harbour of Yangon (Rangoon), taking the Burmese by surprise. The Burmese, pursuing a scorched earth policy, left an empty city behind and chose to fortify positions along an east–west  arc outside the city. The British forces led by General Archibald Campbell took positions inside the Shwedagon Pagoda compound, which was fortified. The British launched attacks on Burmese lines and, by July 1824, had successfully pushed the Burmese towards Kamayut,  from Shwedagon. Burmese efforts to retake Shwedagon in September failed.

King Bagyidaw ordered a near-complete withdrawal from the western front—Bandula from Arakan and Bengal, and Uzana from Assam, Cachar, and Jaintia—and met the enemy in Yangon. In August, in the midst of monsoon season, Bandula and his army crossed the Arakan Yoma. Moving tens of thousands of men over the 3,000-foot-high Arakan hills, or 10,000-foot-high Assamese ranges, heavily forested with only narrow footpaths and open to attack by tigers and leopards, would be difficult even in mild weather conditions. To do this at the height of the drenching monsoon season was a particularly difficult task. Yet Bandula (from Arakan) and Uzana (from Assam), in a testament to their generalship and logistical skills, managed to do just that. The King granted both Bandula and Uzana the title Agga Maha Thenapati, the highest possible military rank. Bandula was also made the governor of Sittaung.

By November, Bandula commanded a force of 30,000 massed outside Yangon. Bandula believed that he could take on a well-armed British force of 10,000 head-on. Although the Burmese were numerically superior, only 15,000 of the 30,000 had muskets. The Burmese cannons fired only balls whereas the British cannons fired exploding shells. Unbeknown to him, the British had just received the first shipment of the newest weapon in the war that the Burmese had never seen—Congreve rockets. More ominously for the Burmese, the speedy march through the hilly regions of Rakhine Yoma and Assamese ranges had left their troops exhausted.

On 30 November, in what turned out be the biggest mistake of his career, Bandula ordered a frontal attack on British positions. The British, with far superior weaponry, withstood several Burmese charges at the Shwedagon fort, cutting down men by the thousands. By 7 December, the British troops, supported by rocket fire, had begun to gain the upper hand. On 15 December, the Burmese were driven out of their last remaining stronghold at Kokine. 

In the end, only 7,000 of the 30,000 Burmese soldiers returned to the royal army. Campbell's despatches stated the Burmese suffered some 6,000 casualties over the fifteen day battle. The rest of the Burmese, most of them conscript fled and returned to their homes. The British losses were considered heavy in proportion as well: 40 officers and 500 other ranks were killed or wounded in combat with a much larger number ill from disease.

Battle of Danubyu (March–April 1825)

Bandula fell back to his rear base at Danubyu, a small town not far from Yangon, in the Irrawaddy delta. Having lost experienced men in Yangon, the Burmese forces now numbered about 10,000, of mixed quality, including some of the king's best soldiers but also many untrained and barely armed conscripts.

In March 1825, a four thousand strong British force supported by a flotilla of gunboats attacked Danubyu. The first British attack failed, and Bandula attempted a counter-charge, with foot soldiers, cavalry and 17 fighting elephants. But the elephants were stopped by rocket fire and the cavalry found it impossible to move against the sustained British artillery fire.

On 1 April, the British launched a major attack, pounding down on the town with their heavy guns and raining their rockets on every part of the Burmese line. Bandula was killed by a mortar shell. Bandula had walked around the fort to boost the morale of his men, in his full insignia under a glittering golden umbrella, disregarding the warnings of his generals that he would prove an easy target for the enemy's guns. After Bandula's death, the Burmese evacuated Danubyu.

Arakan campaign (February–April 1825)
U Sa was left to command the remaining Burmese troops in Arakan after Bandula and the main battalions were ordered to withdraw from Arakan by Bagyidaw to meet the British invasion in Yangon in August 1824. Sa held on to Arakan throughout 1824 while fighting was concentrated in Yangon. 

After Gen. Archibald Campbell finally defeated Gen. Bandula in the Battle of Yangon in December 1824, the British turned their sights on Arakan. On 1 February 1825, an invasion force of 11,000 soldiers supported by gunboats and armed cruisers along the coast, as well as a squadron of cavalry under the command of Gen. Morrison, attacked Burmese positions in Arakan. Despite their superior numbers and firearms, the British had to fight depleted Burmese forces for nearly two months before they reached the main Burmese garrison at Mrauk-U, Arakan's capital. 

On 29 March 1825, the British launched their attack on Mrauk-U. (At the same time, Campbell also launched an attack on Bandula's positions in the Battle of Danubyu.) After a few days of fighting, the Burmese forces at Mrauk-U were defeated on 1 April, coincidentally the same day Maha Bandula fell at Danubyu. Sa and the remaining Burmese forces evacuated and left Arakan. The British proceeded to occupy the rest of Arakan.

Armistice
On 17 September 1825, an armistice was concluded for one month. In the course of the summer, General Joseph Wanton Morrison had conquered the province of Arakan; in the north, the Burmese were expelled from Assam; and the British had made some progress in Cachar, though their advance was finally impeded by the thick forests and jungle.

Peace negotiations that began in September broke down by early October after the Burmese would not agree to British terms. The British had demanded no less than the complete dismemberment of the Burmese western territories in Arakan, Assam, Manipur, and the Tenasserim coast as well as two million pounds sterling of indemnity. The Burmese would not agree to give up Arakan and the large sum of indemnity.

Battle of Prome (November–December 1825)

In November 1825, the Burmese decided to throw everything they had into a last-ditch effort. Starting in mid-November, the Burmese forces, consisting mainly of Shan regiments led by their sawbwas, threatened Prome in a daring circular movement that almost surrounded the town and cut off communications lines to Yangon. In the end, the superior firepower of the British guns and missiles won out. On 1 December, Gen. Campbell, with 2500 European and 1500 Indian sepoys, supported by a flotilla of gunboats, attacked the main Burmese position outside Prome. On 2 December, Maha Ne Myo was killed by a shell launched from the flotilla. After Maha Ne Myo's death, the British dislodged the Burmese by 5 December.

The defeat in Prome effectively left the Burmese army in disarray, and it was in constant retreat from then on. On 26 December, they sent a flag of truce to the British camp. Negotiations having commenced, the Burmese capitulated to the British terms to end the war, signing the Treaty of Yandabo in February 1826.

Treaty of Yandabo

The British demanded and the Burmese agreed to:

 Cede to the British Assam, Manipur, Rakhine (Arakan), and Taninthayi (Tenasserim) coast south of the Salween River
 Cease all interference in Cachar and Jaintia
 Pay an indemnity of one million pounds sterling in four installments
 Allow for an exchange of diplomatic representatives between Ava and Calcutta
 Sign a commercial treaty in due course
 The first installment of indemnity was to be paid immediately, the second installment within the first 100 days from signing of the treaty, and the rest within two years. Until the second installment was paid, the British would not leave Yangon.

The Treaty of Yandabo was signed by General Campbell from the British side and Governor of Legaing Maha Min Hla Kyaw Htin from the Burmese side on 24 February 1826. The Burmese paid 250,000 pounds sterling in gold and silver bullion as the first installment of the indemnity, and also released British prisoners of war. The war was thus brought to an end, and the British army moved south. The British army remained in the territories surrendered to it under the treaty and in the territories such as the Rangoon area which were occupied for several years to guarantee compliance with the financial terms of the treaty.

Aftermath

While both nations suffered heavy military and financial losses, the treaty imposed a more severe financial burden on the Burmese Kingdom and effectively left it crippled. 

The British terms in the negotiations were strongly influenced by the heavy cost in lives and money which the war had entailed. Some 40,000 British and Indians troops had been involved, of whom 15,000 died. British casualties were blamed on poor planning and logistics as only a quarter of the casualties were from the fighting while almost 70% were from tropical diseases. In the Arakan Campaign alone, 659 Europeans out of 1,500 and some 3,500 Indians out of a total of 8,000 died in hospital. The 1st Madras European Regiment lost 600 out of 900 men in two years. Despite the official reports' emphasis on the disparity of death from disease and combat casualties, Captain Frederick Doveton commented on the British casualties that they were nevertheless high for the troops that engaged, "in the case before us the proportion of killed and wounded to the numbers engaged and space of time occupied may bear in comparison to the palmy and bloody days of Talavera and Waterloo!"

The cost to British India's finances had been almost ruinous, amounting to approximately 13 million pounds sterling. The cost of war contributed to a severe economic crisis in India, which by 1833 had bankrupted the Bengal agency houses and cost the British East India Company its remaining privileges, including the monopoly of trade to China.

For the Burmese, the treaty was a total humiliation and a long-lasting financial burden. A whole generation of men had been wiped out in battle. The world the Burmese knew, of conquest and martial pride, built on the back of the impressive military success of the previous seventy-five years, had come crashing down. The Court of Ava could not come to terms with the loss of the territories and made unsuccessful attempts to get them back. An uninvited British resident in Ava was a daily reminder of the humiliating defeat.

In addition, the burden of indemnity left the Burmese royal treasury bankrupt for years. The indemnity of one million pounds sterling was considered a large sum in Europe at that time. It appeared even more daunting when converted to the Burmese kyat equivalent of 10 million. The cost of living of the average villager in Upper Burma in 1826 was one kyat per month.

The British would wage two less expensive wars against the weaker Burmese in 1852 and 1885, and annex Burma by 1885.

British order of battle

Under the command of General Cotton:

British Regiments of Foot: 1st, 41st (270 men), and 89th (260 men) regiments
Madras Native Infantry: 18th and 28th regiments
250 Royal Engineers
100 Pioneers
Some artillery

Under the command of General Campbell:

British Regiments of Foot: 13th, 38th, 47th, and 87th regiments 
2nd Battalion, The Madras European Regiment
Madras Native Infantry: 3rd, 7th, 9th, 12th, 18th, 25th, 26th, 30th, 34th, 43rd, Regiments
1st Battalion Madras Pioneers
Detachment Bengal European Foot Artillery
Bengal Native Infantry: 13th (Light Infantry), 38th, 40th Regiments

Defence at Prome:
Four Madras Native Infantry regiments

In fiction
 On the Irrawaddy by G. A. Henty is a fictional account of the First Anglo-Burmese War.
 'Marching to Ava, A Story of the First Burmese War' by Henry Charles Moore [1904] is a fictional account of the campaign featuring fictional character Guy Clifford along with Sir Archibald Campbell as the Commanding Officer
The first few chapters of the novel The Sabre's Edge by Allan Mallinson are set during the First Anglo-Burmese War.

See also
 Burmese invasions of Assam
 Barrackpore Mutiny of 1824
 Burma–France relations
 History of Burma
 Konbaung dynasty
 Sino–Burmese War (1765–1769)
 Second Anglo-Burmese War
 Third Anglo-Burmese War

References

Further reading 
 
Hall, D.G.E. (1960). Burma. 3rd ed. London: Hutchinson University Library.
 
Htin Aung, Maung (1967). A History of Burma. New York: Columbia University Press.
Myint-U, Thant (2006). The River of Lost Footsteps: Histories of Burma. New York: Farrar, Straus and Giroux.
Harvey, G. E. (1925). History of Burma: From the Earliest Times to 10 March 1824, The Beginning of the English Conquest. London: Longmans, Green, and Co. Retrieved 29 October 2019.

Robertson, Thomas Campbell (1853). Political Incidents of the First Burmese War. London: Richard Bentley, New Burlington Street. Retrieved 29 October 2019.
Trant, Thomas Abercrombie (1827). Two Years in Ava: From May 1824, to May 1826. London: John Murray, Albemarle Street. Retrieved 29 October 2019.
Cox, Hiram (1821). Journal of a Residence in the Burmhan Empire and More Particularly at the Court of Amarapoorah. London: John Warren. Retrieved 29 October 2019.
Doveton, F. B. (1852). Reminiscences of the Burmese War, in 1824-5-6. London: Allen and Co. Retrieved 29 October 2019.
Gouger, Henry (1860). Personal Narrative of Two Years' Imprisonment in Burmah. London: John Murray, Albemarle Street. Retrieved 29 October 2019.
Phayre, Sir Arthur P. (1883). History of Burma: Including Burma Proper, Pegu, Taungu, Tenasserim, and Arakan, from the Earliest Time to the End of the First War with British India. London: Trübner & Co., Ludgate Hill. Retrieved 29 October 2019.

External links

 Text of the Treaty of Yandabo
 Colour plates by Lt. Joseph Moore and (Capt. Frederick Marryat)
 The Somerset Light Infantry in the First Burmese War
 First Anglo-Burmese War British regiments
 Rikard, J. (12 December 2001) First Anglo Burmese War, 1823–1826

 
British rule in Burma
Conflicts in 1823
Conflicts in 1824
Conflicts in 1825
Conflicts in 1826
Anglo-Burmese War 1
Wars involving the United Kingdom
1823 in Burma
1824 in Burma
1825 in Burma
1826 in Burma
19th-century military history of the United Kingdom
1820s in the United Kingdom
History of Assam
19th-century military history of Thailand